The Fourth Ponta Cabinet was the government of Romania from 17 December 2014 to 17 November 2015. The Cabinet was supported by the Social Democratic Party (PSD), the National Union for the Progress of Romania (UNPR) and the Alliance of Liberals and Democrats (ALDE), the alliance forged by Călin Popescu-Tăriceanu's Liberal Reformist Party (PLR) and  Daniel Constantin's Conservative Party (PC). Fourteen of the ministerial portfolios were held by PSD members, three by ALDE, two by UNPR and two by independent members (although Sorin Cîmpeanu was a member of PC).

Overview and notable events 
The Fourth Ponta Cabinet, unlike the previous cabinet, contained only politically appointed ministers. The post of deputy prime minister was abolished. In addition, eight ministerial portfolios were consolidated into four:
 the Ministry of Scientific Research was merged into the Ministry of Education;
 the Ministry of SMEs was merged into the Ministry of Economy;
 the Ministry of Water and Forests was merged into the Ministry of Environment; and
 the Ministry for the Budget was merged into the Ministry of Finance.
The reshuffling of the Third Ponta Cabinet came after ministers from the Hungarian-minority party, Democratic Alliance of Hungarians in Romania (UDMR), left the coalition and resigned from their respective ministries. Prime Minister Ponta decided to change the cabinet's image, which had been negatively affected by his loss in the November 2014 presidential elections and by a scandal involving voting procedures in the diaspora.

During the ceremony of taking the oath, outgoing president, Traian Băsescu, criticized two of the members of the new cabinet, Liviu Pop and Sorin Cîmpeanu, accusing them of contributing to the destruction of educational institutions, calling Ponta a liar and alluding to the plagiarism scandal that resulted in the prime minister surrendering his doctorate.

The Opposition, headed by the National Liberal Party (PNL), announced a possible motion of censure after 1 February 2015, with President Klaus Iohannis supporting the effort to bring down the Ponta government. Iohannis also expressed support for a PNL-led government. A no-confidence motion failed in September 2015, on a 207–276 vote.

On 4 November 2015, Victor Ponta and his Cabinet resigned amid mass protests against generalised corruption linked to the Colectiv nightclub fire, being succeeded by the Cioloș Cabinet, made up entirely by politically independent members.

Structure

Facts and statistics 
The numbers below refer to the composition of the cabinet as of 20 May 2015:
 Number of ministers: 21
 Number of women: 4
 Number of men: 17
 Average age: 46.2 years
 Youngest minister: Marius Nica (34 years)
 Oldest minister: Mircea Dușa (60 years)

Party breakdown 

Party breakdown of cabinet ministers:
 Social Democratic Party (PSD) 
 Alliance of Liberals and Democrats (ALDE) 
 National Union for the Progress of Romania (UNPR) 
 Independent

References 

Ponta IV
2014 establishments in Romania
Cabinets established in 2014
Cabinets disestablished in 2015